The 2017 season is Lillestrøm's 41st consecutive year in Eliteserien and their first full season with Arne Erlandsen as manager.

Squad

Out on loan

Transfers

Winter

In:

Out:

Summer

In:

Out:

Competitions

Eliteserien

Results summary

Results by round

Results

Table

Norwegian Cup

Final

Squad statistics

Appearances and goals

|-
|colspan="14"|Players away from Lillestrøm on loan:

|-
|colspan="14"|Players who left Lillestrøm during the season:

|}

Goal scorers

Disciplinary record

References

Lillestrøm SK seasons
Lillestrom